Raymond Ernest Didier (January 17, 1920 – March 9, 1978) was an American football coach, baseball coach and college athletics administrator. He served as the head football coach at the Southwestern Louisiana Institute—now known as University of Louisiana at Lafayette from 1951 to 1956, tallying a mark of 29–27–2. Didier was also the head baseball coach at Southwestern Louisiana from 1948 to 1956, Louisiana State University from 1957 to 1963 and Nicholls State University from 1964 to 1973, amassing a career college baseball record of 458–311–4. Didier served as the athletic director at Nicholls State from 1963 to 1978.

Accolades
Ray E. Didier Field on the campus of Nicholls State University is named after him. Didier is a member of the Louisiana Sports Hall of Fame.

Head coaching record

Football

Baseball

References

External links
 

1920 births
1978 deaths
Louisiana Ragin' Cajuns baseball coaches
Louisiana Ragin' Cajuns baseball players
Louisiana Ragin' Cajuns football coaches
Louisiana Ragin' Cajuns football players
LSU Tigers baseball coaches
LSU Tigers football coaches
Nicholls Colonels athletic directors
Nicholls Colonels baseball coaches
People from Marksville, Louisiana
Coaches of American football from Louisiana
Players of American football from Baton Rouge, Louisiana
Baseball coaches from Louisiana
Baseball players from Baton Rouge, Louisiana